Heliophanus megae is a jumping spider species in the genus Heliophanus.  It was first described by Wanda Wesołowska in 2003 and lives in Zimbabwe.

References

Salticidae
Endemic fauna of Zimbabwe
Spiders of Africa
Spiders described in 2003
Taxa named by Wanda Wesołowska